Charles Waring (1827 – 26 August 1887) was a Liberal Party and Liberal Unionist Party politician.

Waring was elected Liberal MP for Poole in 1865 but, when the seat was reduced to one member in 1868, he failed to retain the seat. He stood again in 1874, and was elected, but was unseated when the election was declared void on petition after "corrupt conduct and treating". He stood again for the seat in 1880, but was unsuccessful. Shortly before his death, Waring joined the Liberal Unionist Party. His son, Walter Waring, was later elected as the Liberal MP for Banffshire at a by-election in 1907.

Waring was the brother of William and Henry Waring, who formed railway engineering firm Waring Brothers in 1841.

During his life, Waring was made a Chevalier of the Order of Leopold of Belgium, and a Chevalier of the Order of Saints Maurice and Lazarus. He also often contributed to political journal The Fortnightly Review, writing on topics such as the railway industry and the Suez Canal.

On 1 April 1851, he was elected an associate of the Institution of Civil Engineers.

References

External links
 

Liberal Party (UK) MPs for English constituencies
UK MPs 1874–1880
UK MPs 1865–1868
1816 births
1887 deaths